Arne Karlsen (13 October 1939 – 16 July 1960) was a Danish footballer. He played in three matches for the Denmark national football team from 1959 to 1960.

References

External links
 

1939 births
1960 deaths
Danish men's footballers
Denmark international footballers
Place of birth missing
Association footballers not categorized by position
Footballers killed in the 1960 Danish football air crash